John Pugsley (born 1 April 1900) was a Welsh footballer who played in the English Football League for Grimsby Town, Bristol City and Charlton Athletic.

References

Welsh footballers
Cardiff City F.C. players
Grimsby Town F.C. players
Bristol City F.C. players
Charlton Athletic F.C. players
English Football League players
1900 births
1976 deaths
Footballers from Cardiff
People from Grangetown, Cardiff
Association football midfielders
Wales international footballers